William Francis Leeka (born January 18, 1938) is a former American football player. 

Leeka was born in 1938 in Los Angeles County, California, and attended Alhambra High School.

He played college football at the tackle position for the UCLA Bruins football team from 1956 to 1958.  He was selected by Time magazine as a first-team end on its 1958 All-America college football team. He also received All-Pacific Coast Conference (PCC) honors in both 1957 and 1958. He only played a half season in 1958 due to PCC penalties.

He played professional football in 1965 and 1966 for the Hartford Charter Oaks of the Continental Football League.

References

1938 births
Living people
American football tackles
UCLA Bruins football players
Players of American football from Los Angeles